Les Pavillons-sous-Bois is a commune in the eastern suburbs of Paris, France.

History
The commune of Les Pavillons-sous-Bois was created on 3 January 1905 by detaching its territory from the commune of Bondy but the first traces of activity on its territory are found around the 17th century. The name of the commune literally means "the lodges under wood". The lodges mentioned in the name are two guard lodges, built of local stone around 1770 and rehabilitated in 1998, that were located at the entrance of the estate belonging to the château du Raincy. The wood mentioned in the name is the ancient Bondy Forest which covered most of the area to the northeast of Paris.

Population

Transport
Les Pavillons-sous-Bois is served by no station of the Paris Métro or RER, but since 2006 its own Tram station on line , Les Pavillons-sous-bois. The closest RER station to Les Pavillons-sous-Bois is Le Raincy – Villemomble – Montfermeil station on Paris RER line . This station is located in the neighboring commune of Le Raincy,  from the centre of Les Pavillons-sous-Bois.

Urban morphology
The Canal of Ourcq, a channel built by Napoleon III to bring more water to Paris, and the national road RN3 divide the area into a south zone, dedicated to traditional habitat (mainly houses with gardens) and urban activities, and a north zone, for a long time underprivileged, more industrial, nowadays in a rehabilitation process including new habitation areas, sports and leisure areas along the channel and new public service buildings.

Education
Schools:
 Preschools: École Robillard, Marguerite Léopold, Jean-Macé, Eugène Fischer, Fontenoy
 Elementary schools: École Robillard, Julie-Victoire Daubié, Monceau, Pierre Brossolette, Fontenoy
 One special primary school (primaire d'application): École Jules Verne
 Public junior high schools: Collège Anatole France and Collège Eric Tabarly
 Public senior high schools: Lycée Professionnel Nicolas Ledoux
 A private elementary-junior high school: Ecole-Collège privé de l'Alliance

Personalities 
 Herve Batomenila, footballer
 Aïda Fall, basketball player

See also
Communes of the Seine-Saint-Denis department

References

External links

Official website 

Communes of Seine-Saint-Denis